Alexander Bell Patterson (April 22, 1911 – April 2, 1993) was a long-time Canadian member of Parliament (MP) and was briefly leader of the Social Credit Party of Canada.

He was the son of an Irish father and Scottish mother who immigrated  to Canada in 1901. He grew up on the family's farm until moving to Portage la Prairie to work in a 
grocery store. Later he attended the Salvation Army
Leadership Training School in Toronto. In 1938, he married Charlotte Nice, a Salvation Army officer from Neepawa, Manitoba. They raised four children.

From 1935 until 1953, he led
churches in Saskatchewan, Alberta and British 
Columbia. In 1953,  while minister of the Church of the Nazarene in Abbotsford, British Columbia, he was elected to House of Commons of Canada in the 1953 election from the riding of Fraser Valley, British Columbia. He was defeated in the 1958 election. He ran for the party leadership at the 1961 Social Credit leadership convention but withdrew before the first ballot.

Patterson returned to Parliament in 1962. He became acting leader of the Social Credit Party in 1967 when leader Robert N. Thompson resigned citing the party's lack of financial support from its BC and Alberta wings. Once the writs were dropped for the 1968 election, Thompson sought and won the Progressive Conservative Party of Canada nomination in his riding. Bud Olson had left the party a few months before joining the Liberal Party of Canada, leaving Patterson as the acting leader of the remaining three-person Social Credit caucus into the 1968 election in which all three MPs were defeated, including Patterson in Fraser Valley East.

Patterson returned to Parliament in the 1972 election representing Fraser Valley East as a Progressive Conservative, and was subsequently re-elected as a Tory until his retirement from politics in 1984.

References

1911 births
1993 deaths
Members of the House of Commons of Canada from British Columbia
Social Credit Party of Canada MPs
Progressive Conservative Party of Canada MPs
Social Credit Party of Canada leaders
Church of the Nazarene ministers